Ann Didyk (1916–1991) was an American printmaker.

Her work is included in the collections of the Seattle Art Museum, the Arts Council Collection, London and the National Gallery of Art, Washington.

References

1916 births
1991 deaths
20th-century American women artists